Dean Martin Miraldi (born April 8, 1958) is a former American football guard in the National Football League (NFL) for the Philadelphia Eagles, Denver Broncos, and the Los Angeles Raiders.  He played college football at the University of Utah and was drafted by the Eagles in the second round of the 1981 NFL Draft.

1958 births
Living people
Sportspeople from Los Angeles County, California
American football offensive guards
Utah Utes football players
Long Beach State 49ers football players
Philadelphia Eagles players
Denver Broncos players
Los Angeles Raiders players
People from Culver City, California
Players of American football from California